-30- (released as Deadline Midnight in the UK) is a 1959 film directed by Jack Webb and starring Webb and William Conrad as night managing editor and night city editor, respectively, of a fictional Los Angeles newspaper, loosely based on the real-life (and now defunct) Los Angeles Herald-Examiner.

Title

"-30-" is used to signify "the end" or "over and out". It originates from several code tables for telegraph operators, but is traditional in the journalism field and is still used to indicate the end of transmitted news stories and press releases and can frequently be found in formal corporate documents posted on websites and delivered electronically or via print.

Plot
The movie is set between approximately 3 p.m. and just after midnight on a day in November 1959.  Managing Editor Sam Gatlin and his staff put together the early edition of the Examiner, a morning newspaper in Los Angeles. During a particularly active news night, Gatlin and his second wife (of three years), Peggy, disagree about adopting a seven-year-old boy named Billy. Peggy can't have children and wants to adopt.  Gatlin's young son from his first marriage had been killed several years before, presumably in some sort of accident.  Gatlin tells Peggy he can't ever let himself love another child because losing that child, too, would destroy him. Longtime reporter Lady Wilson's grandson pilots a military bomber from Honolulu to New York, intending to set a speed record. A child is lost and feared drowned in the L.A. sewers during this night's torrential rainstorm; Gatlin composes a warning headline with a two-page-wide picture of a storm drain: "DANGER, KIDS! STAY OUT OF THESE! One little girl didn't!". Copy boy Earl Collins considers quitting after failing to place a $1 bet for city editor Jim Bathgate concerning how many babies a famous Italian actress would give birth to that day. It ends up being twins, at 50-1 odds. Bathgate demands and gets an IOU from the woefully underpaid Collins to cover the $50 Bathgate would have won, but Bathgate tears it up, smiling to himself, on his way out of the newsroom at the end of the film.

Cast

See also
 List of American films of 1959

References

External links
 
 

1959 drama films
1959 films
American black-and-white films
American drama films
Films about journalists
Films directed by Jack Webb
Films set in Los Angeles
Mark VII Limited films
Warner Bros. films
1950s English-language films
1950s American films